The Laverne Formation is a geologic formation in Oklahoma. It preserves fossils dating back to the Neogene period.

See also

 List of fossiliferous stratigraphic units in Oklahoma
 Paleontology in Oklahoma

References
 

Neogene geology of Oklahoma